Platyla peloponnesica is a species of very small land snail with an operculum, a terrestrial gastropod mollusk or micromollusk in the family Aciculidae. This species is endemic to Greece.

References

External links 
 

Platyla
Gastropods described in 1989
Gastropods of Europe
Endemic fauna of Greece
Taxonomy articles created by Polbot